Luis Posch is an Austrian luger who competed in the 1950s. He won a bronze medal in the men's doubles event at the 1956 European luge championships in Imst, Austria.

References
List of European luge champions 

Austrian male lugers
Possibly living people
Year of birth missing